Babakhanov is a surname derived from the name Babakhan. The feminine form transliterated from Russian is Babakhanova. The surname may refer to:

Ari Babakhanov, Central Asian musician
Dzhurakhon Babakhanov, Kazakh footballer
Yevgeny Ezhikov-Babakhanov, Soviet and Kazakhstani politician

See also
Babakhanyan